John Wiley Jr., is an expert on Gone With the Wind and the life of its author, Margaret Mitchell. Over the past 40 years, he has assembled a collection of more than 10,000 items of Gone With the Wind and Mitchell memorabilia – including every American edition of the novel and more than 1,000 foreign editions. His collection is featured in the Complete Gone With the Wind Sourcebook.

Wiley has published numerous articles on Mitchell and Gone With the Wind and has been interviewed by Entertainment Weekly, USA Today, The Atlanta Journal-Constitution, and The Times. In 1997, he served as artistic adviser for the U.S. Postal Service's 32-cent Gone With the Wind postage stamp in its 1930s Celebrate the Century series He also is featured in the PBS American Masters documentary Margaret Mitchell: American Rebel.

In February 2011, Wiley co-authored the book Margaret Mitchell's Gone with the Wind: A Bestseller's Odyssey from Atlanta to Hollywood with Ellen F. Brown. It offers a behind-the-scenes look at one of the most popular and controversial novels in history of publishing. 

For more than 30 years, he has published a quarterly newsletter, now called The Scarlett Letter, for Gone with the Wind fans and collectors.

Published works

The Scarlett Letters: The Making of the Film Gone With the Wind

"Forever Scarlett: Vivien Leigh by Emilio Grau Sala," Other People's Books: Association Copies and the Stories They Tell. Chicago: The Caxton Club, 2011.
"Gone With the Wind: Atlanta's Film, Atlanta's Night". Dublin, Ga.: Gone With the Wind Collector's Newsletter, 1990.
Harwell, Richard. "An Enduring Legacy: Margaret Mitchell's Gone With the Wind". edited by John Wiley Jr., Dublin, Ga.: 'Gone With the Wind Collector's Newsletter, 1991.
"Gone With the Wind Memorabilia", Collecting, January 1996.
"Everything Scarlett", Biblio, September 1997.
"70 Years Later, Scarlett Fever Still Raging Around the World", Southeastern Antiquing & Collecting, September 2006.
"Gone With the Wind Much More than Film", Atlanta Journal-Constitution, December 13, 2009.

References

External links
 The Scarlett Letter
 Cynthia McMullen, "Scarlett Fever," Richmond Times Dispatch, December 9, 2007.
 "Collection 10,000 Items Strong," Richmond Times Dispatch, December 9, 2007.
 "How I Got Started: John Wiley, Jr.," Fine Books & Collections, July/August 2007.
 John Steils. "Making the Most of Moonlight Memorabilia", The Barksdale Buzz, November 22, 1997.
Interview with Wiley and Brown on "New Books in Biography"

Gone with the Wind
Living people
Bibliophiles
American collectors
Year of birth missing (living people)